The Sukil waterfalls (Ukrainian: Сукільські водоспади) are located on the Sukil River in the Skole Beskids mountain range of the Ukrainian Carpathians.

Geography
Two of the Sukil waterfalls are located in the village of Sukil in Kalush Raion, Ivano-Frankivsk Oblast.

The last of the Sukil waterfalls is located about twelve kilometers down the Sukil River in the village of Bubnyshche, and consists of six cascades. The highest of these cascades is about one meter high. 

Despite their beauty the Sukil waterfalls remain relatively unknown. They are a popular attraction for tourists who come primarily to see the Dovbush rocks.

Gallery

References 

Geography of Ivano-Frankivsk Oblast
Waterfalls of Ukraine